Rafe is a given name for a male used in many countries across the world. If the name is English, Scandinavian or German it is of Old Norse origin (meaning "counsel of the wolf" or "wise wolf"), derived from the Old Norse Raðulfr (rað "counsel" + ulfr "wolf") through Old English Rædwulf. When the name is Italian, Spanish, Portuguese or Hebrew it is often a short form of Rafael.

Notable people
 Rafe Champion (born 1945), Australian writer
 Rafe Custance (born 1994), New Zealand actor
 Rafe de Crespigny (born 1936), Australian sinologist, professor and writer
 Rafe Esquith, American award-winning elementary school teacher
 Rafe Furst, American entrepreneur and poker player, founder of Full Tilt Poker
 Rafe Gomez (born 1961/1962), American music producer
 Rafe Judkins (born 1983), American contestant on Survivor and television writer
 Rafe Mair (1931–2017), Canadian lawyer, political commentator and former radio personality and  politician
 Rafe Needleman, American editor and author
 Rafe Spall (born 1983), English actor
 Rafe Stefanini, Italian musician, singer, teacher and violin maker
 Rafe Wolfe (born 1985), Jamaican footballer

Fictional characters
 Rafe, in Christopher Marlowe's play Doctor Faustus
 Rafe, in Francis Beaumont's 1607 play The Knight of the Burning Pestle
 Rafe, a minor character in Victoria Aveyard's "Red Queen" series. Like the main protagonist, he is a newblood Electricon who can create and control lightning at will.
 Rafe Adler, the main antagonist of the 2016 video game Uncharted 4: A Thief's End
 Rafe Cameron, a character in the series Outer Banks
 Rafe Durville, on New Zealand daytime drama Shortland Street
 Rafe Garretson, on the soap opera One Life to Live
 Rafe Gruber, on NBC primetime series Chuck
 Rafe Guttman, the lead in the film Bordello of Blood
 Rafe Hernandez, on the soap opera Days of Our Lives
 Rafe Hollister, moonshiner and singer on The Andy Griffith Show
 Rafe Kovich, on the soap opera Port Charles
 Rafe McCawley, the lead in the film Pearl Harbor, played by Ben Affleck
 Rafe McCawley, a lead in the SyFy series Defiance, played by Graham Greene
 Rafael "Rafe" Khatchadorian, protagonist of James Patterson's book Middle School: The Worst Years of My Life

Nickname

See also
 Raja Rafe (born 1983), Syrian footballer
 Ralph, another form of this name
 Raef, a variant spelling
 Rafer, a similar name

Masculine given names
English masculine given names
Germanic masculine given names